The Men's synchronized 3 metre springboard competition at the 2017 World Championships was held on 15 July 2017.

Results
The preliminary round was started at 10:00. The final was held at 18:30.

Green denotes finalists

References

Men's synchronized 3 metre springboard